Crippen may refer to:

People
 Dan Crippen (born 1952), American bureaucrat
 Dick Crippen, American sports commentator
 Fran Crippen (1984–2010), American open-water swimmer
 Hawley Harvey Crippen (1862–1910), American homeopath hanged in England for murdering his wife
 Robert Crippen (born 1937), American astronaut

Other
 Doctor Crippen (1942 film), a German film
 Dr. Crippen (1962 film), a British film
 Crippen, a 2004 novel by John Boyne